This article is about the list of regions of Baltic States by gross regional product (GRP).

Regions according to their gross regional product in EUR.

References 

Baltic states-related lists
Economy of Estonia-related lists
Economy of Latvia-related lists
Economy of Lithuania-related lists
Gross state product
Ranked lists of country subdivisions